TorinoFilmLab (TFL) is a Turin-based laboratory that primarily supports persons working on their first and second fiction feature films. Its four main fields of involvement are training, development, funding and distribution.

TorinoFilmLab runs several projects in each of these fields every year.  They end at the TFL Meeting Event in November during the Torino Film Festival, when participants of the different programmes present their work to a selected group of producers, sales agents, distributors and other professionals in independent filmmaking.

History 
This lab was created in 2008 with the aim of complementing Torino Film Festival with a laboratory dedicated to emerging filmmakers.

TFL offers various residential workshops and on-line sessions to its participants. The programmes run parallel during the year and reach their conclusion in November at the TFL Meeting Event during the Torino Film Festival. At this occasion, TFL also hand over various awards in order to financially support the production and distribution of the selected films.

TFL is financed by Ministero dei beni e delle attività culturali, Regione Piemonte and Città di Torino, and is promoted by the main film institutions established in Turin and Piedmont – Museo Nazionale del Cinema and Film Commission Torino Piemonte. It is also partially funded by the European Union programme Creative Europe and by partners from several countries. In 2015, about 57% of the funding came from outside Italy.

Courses
TFL offers courses in various areas in filmmaking, with a particular emphasis on scriptwriting (both original and adaptation, as well as story editing), pre-production and distribution. About 40 projects are selected each year.

The supported films 
Since its inception in 2008 more than 50 films have had TFL support. Seven films supported by TFL were selected at Cannes Film Festival 2016, and 5 of them received major awards.

Selection of Supported Films

Alumni 

From 2008 to 2015, TFL has trained 480 participants from 70 countries.

Notable alumni

 Jonas Carpignano
 
 Aida Begić
 
 Álvaro Brechner
 
 Antonio Piazza
 
 Fabio Grassadonia
 
 György Pálfi
 
 Haifaa al-Mansour
 
 Jan-Ole Gerster
 
 Juho Kuosmanen
 
 Julia Ducournau
 
 László Nemes
 
 Michelangelo Frammartino
 
 Oliver Laxe
 
 Ritesh Batra

References

External links 
 

Film organisations in Italy
Laboratories in Italy